Edward Martino Crowley (August 21, 1935 – March 7, 2020) was an American playwright best known for his 1968 play The Boys in the Band.

Biography
Crowley was born in Vicksburg, Mississippi. After graduating from The Catholic University of America (studying acting and show business) in Washington, D.C. in 1957, Crowley headed west to Hollywood, where he worked for a number of television production companies before meeting Natalie Wood on the set of her film Splendor in the Grass. Wood hired him as her assistant, primarily to give him ample free time to work on his gay-themed play The Boys in the Band, which opened off-Broadway on April 14, 1968 and enjoyed a run of 1,000 performances. Crowley became part of Wood's inner circle of friends that she called "the nucleus", whose main requirement was that they pass a "kindness" test.

The Boys in the Band was adapted into a film in 1970 directed by William Friedkin.

Crowley's 2002 sequel to The Boys in the Band was entitled The Men from the Boys.

In 2018 Boys in the Band was restaged on Broadway in a 50th anniversary revival featuring Matt Bomer, Jim Parsons, Zachary Quinto, and Andrew Rannells.

Crowley also wrote and produced Remote Asylum and the autobiographical A Breeze from the Gulf. In 1979 and 1980, Crowley served first as the executive script editor and then producer of the ABC series Hart to Hart, starring Wood's husband Robert Wagner and Stefanie Powers. His other credits include the teleplays for There Must Be a Pony (1986), Bluegrass (1988), People Like Us (1990), and a reunion special of Hart to Hart in 1996.

Crowley appeared in at least four documentaries: The Celluloid Closet (1995), about the depiction of homosexuality in cinema; Dominick Dunne: After the Party (2007), a biography of Crowley's friend and producer Dominick Dunne; Making the Boys (2011), a documentary about the making of the gay play and subsequent Hollywood movie; and The Boys in the Band: Something Personal (2020), a documentary about the 2020 Netflix film of the play.

Crowley died in Manhattan on March 7, 2020. He suffered a heart attack, after which he underwent open-heart surgery and died while recovering. The 2020 film was dedicated to the memory of Crowley. Crowley was openly gay.

See also
 LGBT culture in New York City
 List of LGBT people from New York City

References

Further reading

Archival Sources
Charles Boultenhouse and Parker Tyler Papers, 1927-1994 (35 boxes) are housed at the New York Public Library.  Includes correspondence with Mart Crowley from 1969 to 1972.
Lucille Lortel Papers, 1902-2000 (49.61 linear feet; 37 vols.) are housed in the New York Public Library.  Includes correspondence with Mart Crowley from 1996.

External links 
 
 
 Matt Crowley at The New York Times

1935 births
2020 deaths
20th-century American dramatists and playwrights
American male screenwriters
American gay writers
Lambda Literary Award for Drama winners
American LGBT dramatists and playwrights
LGBT people from Mississippi
Catholic University of America alumni
People from Fire Island, New York
People from Vicksburg, Mississippi
Writers from Mississippi
American male dramatists and playwrights
American people of Irish descent
20th-century American male writers
Screenwriters from New York (state)
Screenwriters from Mississippi
20th-century American screenwriters